is the eighth physical single by J-pop artist Kyary Pamyu Pamyu, released on February 26, 2014 in both regular and limited editions. The song is used in a commercial for the Japanese room rental app Chintai while the B-Side "Slowmo" is used for Meganetop's ALOOK budget glasses commercials. The music video of the song was released on February 19, 2014.

Development
The B-Side Slow-Mo was first heard on December 3, 2013 in the ALOOK glasses commercial, featuring Kyary dressed in an outfit made of glasses. On January 1, 2014, Kyary herself confirmed the new single, then untitled, in her new year's message. She announced the title later in her birthday concert  on January 18–19, 2014. The cover art and information on her 2nd World Tour was then later revealed by her recording label Unborde.

Kyary's plan for 2014 was "evolution", with the single's theme revolving on Graduation.

Kyary's first live performances of "Yume no Hajima Ring Ring" were at the North American leg of the Nanda Collection World Tour.

Track listing

CD artwork personnel
Credits adapted from liner notes.
Steve Nakamura – art director, designer
Shinji Konishi – hair, make-up
Kumiko Iijima – stylist
Takeshi Hanzawa – photographer

Music video
On February 19, 2014; Kyary announced a music video for Yume No Hajima Ring Ring. The theme of the video is "Graduation." The video begins with her walking on her knees, to look like a child, with a polar bear holding her hand. Child Kyary encounters her older self from her initial modeling career. She sheds a tear as her model self walks away. Model-era Kyary walks onward, with the camera following. Model-era Kyary then graduates, receiving a diploma from Ponponpon-era-Kyary. Model-era Kyary then sheds a tear as Ponponpon-era Kyary walks onward, then sits down while kinetic typography is displayed, then walks by numerous props from previous videos. Ponponpon-era Kyary then meets Fashion Monster-era Kyary on a bench. Ponponpon-era Kyary sheds a tear as Fashion Monster-era Kyary leaves, recreates part of the music video for Fashion Monster, then resumes walking onward. Fashion Monster-era Kyary then hits a TV, seeing now-modern Kyary in hakama, dancing with the new background dancers, the polar bear still watching. All of the previous Kyary incarnations call back to her on a Videophone. Kyary then walks for a while with the polar bear, gives it a hug, and then waves goodbye to it. She then walks off alone, as the polar bear begins to cry at her departure.

The video contains numerous references to previous videos of her. Some of them include:
 Costume parts on the background dancers from Mottai Night Land
 The titlecard from Candy Candy
 A slightly modified version of the Ponponpon outfit
 Cardboard cutouts of some of the random bodyparts from Ponponpon
 Twin-Kyary from Candy Candy
 The giant eyeball from "Tsukematsukeru"
 The talking onion from Candy Candy
 The pattern and number 20 from "Furisodeshon"
 A background dancer from "Ninja Re Bang Bang"
 A ghost head from "Mottai Night Land"
 The Fashion Monster outfit
 The fabric from Fashion Monster
 Several musical instruments from Fashion Monster, including the Steampunk Guitar.
 Choreography from Fashion Monster
 Part of the Titlecard from "Invader Invader"

Charts

References

2014 singles
Songs written by Yasutaka Nakata
Kyary Pamyu Pamyu songs
Warner Music Group singles
2014 songs
Song recordings produced by Yasutaka Nakata
Unborde singles
Songs involved in plagiarism controversies
J-pop songs
Japanese songs
Songs about school
Songs about parting